The Cincinnati Reds are a professional baseball team based in Cincinnati.  The Reds play in the Central Division of Major League Baseball's (MLB) National League (NL).  In its 122 major league seasons, the franchise has won 5 World Series championships, tied for seventh most with the Pittsburgh Pirates.  The Reds played their home games at Riverfront Stadium from 1970 to 2002 and at Crosley Field before that, from 1912 to 1970.  In 2003, the team moved into Great American Ball Park, located on the banks of the Ohio River and built on the old site of Riverfront Stadium.

The history of the Cincinnati Reds dates back to 1876, where they were originally called the "Red Stockings" and were the first true professional baseball team in the United States.  The modern Cincinnati Reds began play in 1882 as members of the American Association, which Reds won in their first year of competition.  The Reds joined Major League Baseball in 1890 and began their play in the National League.  Over their history, the Reds have won 10 National League Pennants and made it to the post season 13 times, along with their five World Series Championships.
 
Following the Cincinnati Reds second championship in 1940, the franchise only had one post-season appearance between 1941 and 1969. During the 1970s, however, the Reds would appear in the post-season six times during the decade, along with four National League pennants, and back-to-back World Series championships in 1975 and 1976.   The Reds were nicknamed Big Red Machine during the time period and complied, what some have claimed to be, the best teams in major league baseball history.  Following the 1976 championship and Big Red Machine era, the Reds struggled to sustain consistent post-season appearances.

The fifth and most recent championship for the Cincinnati Reds came in 1990, in which that team went wire-to-wire and swept the World Series. The Reds have made only five post-season appearances since 1991, with their most recent appearance coming in 2020.

Overall, the Reds have compiled a winning percentage of .508 over their history and also achieved a franchise mark of 10,000 wins on April 20, 2012, becoming just the sixth major league franchise to accomplish the feat. The Reds lost their 10,000th game on August 28, 2015. They were the fourth major league baseball franchise to reach this number.

Table key

Seasons

Record by decade 
The following table describes the Reds' MLB win–loss record by decade.

These statistics are from Baseball-Reference.com's Cincinnati Reds History & Encyclopedia, and are current as of October 4, 2018.

Postseason record by year
The Reds have made the postseason sixteen times in their history, with their first being in 1919 and the most recent being in 2020.

Notes
This is determined by calculating the difference in wins plus the difference in losses divided by two.
For lists of all National League pennant winners, see National League pennant winners 1901–68 and National League Championship Series.
Half-game increments are possible because games can be cancelled due to rain. If a postponed game is the last of the season between two teams in one of their stadiums, it may not be made up if it does not affect the playoff race.
In 1969, the National League split into East and West divisions.
The 1972 Major League Baseball strike forced the cancellation of the Reds' first eight games of the season.
The 1981 Major League Baseball strike caused the season to be split into two halves. The Reds finished with the overall best record in major league baseball, but finished second in both halves of the season and was ineligible for a post-season appearance.
In 1994, a players' strike wiped out the last eight weeks of the season and all post-season. Cincinnati was in first place in the Central Division by a half game over Houston when play was stopped. No official titles were awarded in 1994.
In 1994, the National League split into East, West and Central divisions.
In 1999, the Reds finished the regular season tied with the New York Mets for the Wild Card, but lost a one-game playoff.

References
General

Specific

 
Cincinnati Reds
Seasons